The Woman in Red is a 1935 American drama film directed by Robert Florey and starring Barbara Stanwyck and Gene Raymond. Based on the novel North Shore by Wallace Irwin, the film is about a woman equestrian who meets and falls in love with a traveling polo player from a once wealthy family. After they are married, she is persuaded to entertain her friend's wealthy client aboard a yacht. The client accidentally drowns, and her friend is arrested for his murder. Determined to keep her name out of the press, the friend does not reveal that he has a witness who can prove his innocence.

Plot
Shelby Barret is a stable hand who rides show horses for snobbish wealthy widow Mrs. Nicholas, nicknamed Nicko. She meets Johnny Wyatt, the destitute son of a once-wealthy Long Island family who plays polo for Nicko. Nouveau-riche Gene Fairchild, a horseman who rides his own entries, is in love with Shelby, while Nicko is in love with Johnny, who has curried her favour. However, despite their efforts, Shelby and Johnny fall in love, and Nicko and Fairchild are jealous of their budding relationship. Nicko fires Shelby, which only encourages Johnny to leave her employ, and they elope to marry. Johnny brings Shelby home to Wyattville, the town named for his family, but his snobbish family does not approve of Shelby and treat her frigidly. They frown even more when the newlyweds start a business handling the horses of wealthy neighbours. Shelby had been expecting a loan from her grandfather in Kentucky to start the business, but when he is unable to provide the money, Shelby borrows from Fairchild without telling the proud but broke Johnny. Nicko soon shows up and starts gossip against Shelby, which does not help matters.

When Johnny is away Fairchild invites Shelby aboard his yacht to help him entertain a wealthy client. She tries to contact Johnny, but when that fails she accepts the invitation. The client and his female companion, chorus girl Olga, show up drunk. Olga accidentally falls overboard and drowns, and Fairchild is accused of her murder. He intends to keep Shelby out of the case although it looks bad for him, while Shelby is afraid of scandal. While the case is in progress, with one of the ship's officers saying that he saw Fairchild leaving the ship with a mysterious "woman in red," the Wyatt family talk about the case.  Shelby snaps and confesses that she is the woman in question. She shows up at the court at the last minute to provide witness. The Wyatt family also comes to the court to defend her, if only to protect the family name. Shelby tells the court it was her, and thus she saves Fairchild. She knows that in making her confession she is risking her marriage, and wonders whether Johnny will understand and forgive her, although she has done nothing to be forgiven for. Eugene proposes that Shelby divorce Johnny and marry him, but Shelby admits she still loves her husband. In the end, Shelby and Johnny are reconciled, and Johnny chooses her love over his family acceptance.

Cast

 Barbara Stanwyck as Shelby Barret Wyatt
 Gene Raymond as John 'Johnny' Wyatt
 Genevieve Tobin as Mrs. 'Nicko' Nicholas
 John Eldredge as Eugene 'Gene' Fairchild
 Phillip Reed as Dan McCall
 Dorothy Tree as Mrs. Olga Goodyear
 Russell Hicks as Defense Attorney Clayton
 Nella Walker as Aunt Bettina
 Claude Gillingwater as Grandpa Wyatt
 Doris Lloyd as Mrs. Casserly
 Hale Hamilton as Wyatt Furness
 Edward Van Sloan as Prosecuting Attorney Foxall
 Forrester Harvey as Mooney
 Bill Elliott as Stuart Wyatt
 Frederick Vogeding as Nels Erickson
 Brandon Hurst as Uncle Emlen Wyatt
 George Chandler as First Reporter (uncredited)
 Arthur Treacher as Major Albert Casserly (uncredited)

References

External links
 
 

1935 films
1935 drama films
American black-and-white films
1930s English-language films
Films directed by Robert Florey
American drama films
1930s American films
Films scored by Bernhard Kaun
Films based on American novels